Context-based learning (CBL) refers to the use of real-life and fictitious examples in teaching environments in order to learn through the actual, practical experience with a subject rather than just its mere theoretical parts. CBL is student centred approach to teaching and learning, utilising scenarios to replicate the social and political context of the students working/or potential working environment  In the United Kingdom, CBL is often referred to as the Salters' approach due to the efforts of the Salters' Company in creating teaching material in the field of chemistry. It can be generalized as: "The most important single factor influencing learning is the active engagement of the learner with the material. Obtain this – and teach by whatever methods retain this engagement."

References

Applied learning
Educational practices